Super Bowl XXXVIII was an American football game between the National Football Conference (NFC) champion Carolina Panthers and the American Football Conference (AFC) champion New England Patriots to decide the National Football League (NFL) champion for the 2003 season. The Patriots  defeated the Panthers by a score of 32–29.  The game was played at Reliant Stadium in Houston, Texas, on February 1, 2004. At the time, this was the most watched Super Bowl ever with 144.4 million viewers.

The Panthers were making their first ever Super Bowl appearance after posting an 11–5 regular season record. They also made it the second straight year that a team from the NFC South division made the Super Bowl, with the Tampa Bay Buccaneers winning Super Bowl XXXVII.  The Patriots, led by head coach Bill Belichick and quarterback Tom Brady, were seeking their second Super Bowl title in three years after posting a 14–2 record. 

NFL fans and sports writers widely consider this game one of the most well-played and thrilling Super Bowls; Sports Illustrated writer Peter King hailed it as the "Greatest Super Bowl of all time." Although neither team could score in the first and third quarters, they ended up with a combined total of 868 yards and 61 points. The game was scoreless for a Super Bowl record 26:55 before the two teams combined for 24 points prior to halftime. The clubs then combined for a Super Bowl record 37 points in the fourth quarter. The contest was finally decided when the Patriots kicker Adam Vinatieri's 41-yard field goal was made with four seconds left. Patriots quarterback Tom Brady was named Super Bowl MVP for the second time in his career.

The game is also known for its controversial halftime show in which Janet Jackson's breast, adorned with a nipple shield, was exposed by Justin Timberlake for about half a second, in what was later referred to as a "wardrobe malfunction". Along with the rest of the halftime show, it led to an immediate crackdown by the Federal Communications Commission (FCC), and widespread debate on perceived indecency in broadcasting.

Background
NFL owners voted to award Super Bowl XXXVIII to Houston during their November 1, 2000 meeting held in Atlanta. This was the first Super Bowl to be played in a stadium with a retractable roof (but it was eventually closed during the game). It also marked the first time in 4 tries that the Patriots played a Super Bowl that was not in New Orleans. This game marked a six-month stretch for Texas hosting the Super Bowl, NCAA men's Division I basketball Final Four and Major League Baseball (MLB) All-Star Game. The Final Four was played at the Alamodome in San Antonio and the MLB All-Star Game was also played in Houston at nearby Minute Maid Park.

Super Bowl XXXVIII was the first Super Bowl to be scheduled on the first Sunday of February;  Every subsequent Super Bowl through Super Bowl LV would follow this format. Super Bowl XXXVI had previously been held on the first Sunday of February as well, but that came as a result of the NFL pushing back the 2001 playoffs by a week as a result of the September 11 attacks.

This game set the record for most Roman numerals in a Super Bowl title (seven). This will not be matched until Super Bowl LXXVIII after the 2043 NFL season and Super Bowl LXXXVII after the 2052 season, and not surpassed until Super Bowl LXXXVIII after the 2053 season.

Panthers go from 1–15 to the Super Bowl

The Panthers made their first trip to the Super Bowl after posting a one-win regular season just two years earlier. The franchise was only in their ninth year of existence, joining the league as an expansion team in 1995. In just their second season, they posted a 12–4 regular season record and advanced to the NFC Championship Game, but lost to the eventual Super Bowl champion Green Bay Packers 30–13 (the Packers coincidentally went on to defeat the Patriots in Super Bowl XXXI 35–21). But from 1997 onward, they had just one non-losing season (an 8–8 finish in 1999) until they finally suffered through a franchise worst 1–15 record in 2001, winning only the first game of the regular season against the Minnesota Vikings. After that year, head coach George Seifert was relieved of his duties and replaced by John Fox, former defensive coordinator for the New York Giants who helped lead the Giants to Super Bowl XXXV in 2000.

With John Fox at the helm and the team taking advantage of the free agent market and the salary cap rules, the Panthers improved in 2002, finishing with a 7–9 record. Then in 2003, they recorded an 11–5 record and won the NFC South.

One of the free agents that Carolina signed before the 2003 season was quarterback Jake Delhomme. Delhomme was not picked by any team in the NFL Draft, but later joined the New Orleans Saints as an undrafted free agent in 1998. Delhomme also then played for the NFL Europe's Frankfurt Galaxy in 1999, and along with Pat Barnes, he was part of the "double-headed quarterback monster" that led the Galaxy to a World Bowl victory over the Barcelona Dragons.

Although he only played 6 games in his 5 seasons with New Orleans, the Panthers signed Delhomme in 2003 to be the backup to starting quarterback Rodney Peete. However, after the Panthers fell to a 17–0 third quarter deficit in their first game of the season against the Jacksonville Jaguars, gaining only one first down and 36 offensive yards, Fox immediately replaced Peete with Delhomme. Delhomme ended up leading Carolina to a 24–23 comeback victory over the Jaguars.

Delhomme became the team's starting quarterback for the rest of the season, throwing for 3,219 yards and 19 touchdowns, with 16 interceptions. The team's main receiving threat was multi-talented third-year wide receiver Steve Smith, who also specialized as a kickoff and punt returner. Smith caught 88 passes for 1,110 yards and 7 touchdowns, rushed for 42 yards, gained 439 yards and another touchdown returning punts, and recorded 309 kickoff return yards. Wide receiver Muhsin Muhammad was also a constant breakaway threat, recording 54 receptions for 837 yards and 3 touchdowns.

However, the Panthers' strength on offense was their running game, led by running backs Stephen Davis and DeShaun Foster. Davis was the team's leading rusher with a franchise record 1,444 yards and 8 touchdowns, while Foster rushed for 429 yards and caught 26 passes for 207 yards. Carolina also had running back Rod Smart on their roster, who became widely known for his XFL debut jersey name "He Hate Me" during that league's only season in 2001. During 2003, Smart was primarily used as the Panthers' other kickoff returner, recording 947 yards and one touchdown.

On defense, Carolina's main strength was their defensive line, anchored by defensive ends Julius Peppers (7 sacks and 3 forced fumbles) and Mike Rucker (12 sacks and 1 interception), and Pro Bowl defensive tackle Kris Jenkins (5 sacks and 1 fumble recovery). The secondary was led by defensive backs Reggie Howard (2 interceptions), Mike Minter (3 interceptions for 100 return yards and 2 touchdowns), Deon Grant (3 interceptions), and Ricky Manning Jr. (3 interceptions for 33 return yards and 1 touchdown).

Patriots go for two out of three

Despite their victory in Super Bowl XXXVI after the 2001 season, the Patriots stumbled early in the 2002 season, recorded a 9–7 regular season record, and failed to make the playoffs.

Then, New England seemed to implode before the 2003 season ever started. Five days before their opening game against the Buffalo Bills, Pro Bowl safety Lawyer Milloy, one of the Patriots' defensive leaders, was unexpectedly cut by the team after refusing to restructure his contract. The move devastated many of the New England players, while Milloy immediately signed with the Bills two days later. With the Patriots seemingly in emotional disarray, Buffalo defeated New England, 31–0, with Milloy forcing an interception and recording one sack and five tackles.

However, after a 2–2 start, the Patriots ended up winning their last 12 games (including a mirror 31–0 shutout of the Bills in the final week) to earn a league-best 14–2 record.

Tom Brady, the Super Bowl XXXVI MVP, had become the team's permanent starter in 2002 after quarterback Drew Bledsoe left the team to lead the Bills. Brady had a solid season in 2003, completing 317 out of 527 (60.2 percent) of his passes for 3,620 yards and 23 touchdowns, with only 12 interceptions. His primary weapon was second year wide receiver Deion Branch, who caught 57 passes for 803 yards.  Another key contributor was wide receiver David Givens, who filled in for the injured starter David Patten. Givens recorded 34 receptions for 510 yards and 6 touchdowns. Other weapons in the passing game included veteran wide receiver Troy Brown, who had 40 receptions, 472 yards, 4 touchdowns, and 293 yards returning punts, and tight end Daniel Graham who recorded 28 catches, 409 yards, and 4 touchdowns.  Rookie receiver Bethel Johnson returned 30 kickoffs for 847 yards and a touchdown, ranking second in the NFL with a 28.2 yards per return average, while also catching 16 passes for 209 yards and 2 scores.

In the backfield, the team's rushing game was led by running backs Antowain Smith and Kevin Faulk, who carried the ball equally.  Smith was the team's leading rusher with 642 yards and 3 touchdowns, while Faulk rushed for 638 yards and caught 48 passes for 440 yards.

New England's defense was retooled before the 2003 season when the team signed veteran safety Rodney Harrison as a free agent and traded for defensive lineman Ted Washington. With these additions, the Patriots led the league in fewest passing yards allowed per attempt (5.64), fewest passing touchdowns allowed (11), and most interceptions (29). They also ranked 4th in fewest rushing yards allowed (1,434) and 7th in fewest total yards (4,919).

Washington helped anchor New England's defensive line, recording 32 tackles and 2 sacks. Pro Bowl defensive tackle Richard Seymour also contributed with 8 sacks. Behind them, the Patriots had 3 outstanding linebackers: Pro Bowl linebacker Willie McGinest (5.5 sacks, 2 fumble recoveries and 1 interception), Mike Vrabel (9.5 sacks, 1 fumble recovery, four forced fumbles, and 2 interceptions), and Tedy Bruschi (131 tackles, 2 sacks, 1 fumble recovery, 3 interceptions, and 2 touchdowns).

Harrison became the veteran leader in the secondary, recording 92 tackles, 3 interceptions, and 3 sacks. Meanwhile, Pro Bowl cornerback Ty Law recorded 6 interceptions, cornerback (and ex-Panthers player) Tyrone Poole had 6 interceptions for 112 return yards and 1 touchdown, and rookie safety Eugene Wilson recorded 4 interceptions. Overall, the secondary combined for 19 interceptions.

Common opponents of both teams
The Patriots and Panthers both played against the AFC South and NFC East in the regular season.  The Patriots lost to the Washington Redskins 20–17 in Week Four but swept the rest of the NFC East and the entire AFC South; the Patriots shut out Dallas in bitter cold and edged the Giants in the rain while hammering Philly following the infamously erroneous "They hate their coach" quote from Tom Jackson; the Patriots also edged the Titans, Houston in overtime, and former division rival Indianapolis in shootouts while routing Jacksonville (which, like Carolina, had entered the NFL in 1995) in the regular season, and then edged the Titans and hammered the Colts in the playoffs.  The Panthers had less success, going 6–4 against the two divisions, losing to the Titans and Houston while defeating Jacksonville and the Colts, and defeating Washington and the Giants while losing to Philadelphia and Dallas in the regular season, then routing the Cowboys and edging the Eagles in the playoffs.
 Scores of games against common opponents -

VS. Jacksonville Jaguars
 Panthers 24 vs. Jaguars 23 – Jake Delhomme's first game with the Panthers
 Patriots 27 vs. Jaguars 13

VS. Philadelphia Eagles
 Patriots 31 @ Eagles 10
 Panthers 16 vs. Eagles 25 / (playoffs) Panthers 14 @ Eagles 3

VS. Washington Redskins
 Patriots 17 @ Redskins 20 – last loss until Halloween 2004
 Panthers 20 vs. Redskins 17

VS. Tennessee Titans
 Patriots 38 vs. Titans 30 / (playoffs) Patriots 17 vs. Titans 14
 Panthers 17 vs. Titans 37 – loss ended six-game win streak

VS. New York Giants
 Patriots 17 vs. NY Giants 6
 Panthers 37 @ NY Giants 24

VS. Indianapolis Colts
 Panthers 23 @ Colts 20 (OT) – win ended Colts five-game win streak
 Patriots 38 @ Colts 34 / (playoffs) Patriots 24 vs. Colts 14

VS. Houston Texans
 Panthers 10 @ Texans 14
 Patriots 23 @ Texans 20 (OT)

VS. Dallas Cowboys
 Patriots 12 vs. Cowboys 0
 Panthers 20 @ Cowboys 24 / (playoffs) Panthers 29 vs. Cowboys 10

Playoffs

Since the Panthers finished with the third best regular season record in the NFC, they had to win three playoff games to reach the Super Bowl. The St. Louis Rams and the Philadelphia Eagles had better regular season records at 12–4, and thus under the playoff format, each would have to win two playoff games to reach the league championship game. Against Carolina's first opponent, the Dallas Cowboys, Delhomme threw for 273 yards and a touchdown, Davis recorded 104 rushing yards and a touchdown, and kicker John Kasay made 5 field goals, en route to a thorough 29–10 victory.

The Panthers then eliminated the Rams on the road, 29–23 in double overtime. St. Louis built a 6–0 lead early in the second quarter, but Carolina took the lead after Muhammad's fumble recovery in the end zone. Both teams spent the rest of the second and the third quarter exchanging field goals before Brad Hoover's 7-yard rushing touchdown gave the Panthers a 23–12 fourth quarter lead. However, the Rams rallied back with a touchdown, a successful two-point conversion, and a field goal to send the game into overtime. Both teams missed field goals in the first overtime period, but Delhomme threw a 69-yard touchdown pass to Smith on the first play of the second overtime period to win the game.

The Panthers then went on the road again to eliminate the Eagles in the NFC Championship Game, 14–3. Philadelphia was coming off of a 20–17 overtime win over the Green Bay Packers, that included quarterback Donovan McNabb's 28-yard pass to Freddie Mitchell on a famous play known as "4th and 26". This was the third consecutive NFC Championship Game appearance for Philadelphia, and thus they were heavily favored to win. But Carolina's defense only allowed a field goal and held McNabb to just 10 of 22 completions for 100 yards. Ricky Manning also intercepted McNabb 3 times. Although Carolina's offense only scored 14 points, it was more than enough for the team to earn their first trip to the Super Bowl with a 14–3 win.

The Panthers became the first No. 3 seed to advance to the Super Bowl since the league expanded to a 12-team playoff format in 1990. In doing so, they were also the first division winner to advance to the league championship after playing three playoff games. All other instances up to this point where teams advanced to the Super Bowl after playing all three rounds of the playoffs were wild card teams in Super Bowls XV, XX, XXVII, XXXII, XXXIV, and XXXV. Prior to Super Bowl XVII, the Miami Dolphins and Washington Redskins both won three playoff games to reach the Super Bowl, but that came during the strike-shortened 1982 season when the regular season was reduced to nine games and the playoffs were expanded to 16 teams, with no teams receiving first-round byes. Since then, there have been seven instances of teams advancing to the Super Bowl after playing three playoff games: the Pittsburgh Steelers in Super Bowl XL as the No. 6 seeded team, the Indianapolis Colts in Super Bowl XLI as the No. 3 seed, the New York Giants in Super Bowl XLII as the No. 5 seed, the Arizona Cardinals in Super Bowl XLIII as the No. 4 seed, the Green Bay Packers in Super Bowl XLV as the No. 6 seed, again the New York Giants in Super Bowl XLVI as the No. 4 seed, and the Tampa Bay Buccaneers in Super Bowl LV as the No. 5 seed. The Colts, Cardinals, and the Giants in 2011, like the Panthers, were division winners in those years (Although in the Colts case, they played the No. 4 seeded New England Patriots in the AFC Championship that year, ensuring at least the second division winner to play three rounds to make it to the Super Bowl.), and all but the Cardinals went on to win it all. The Super Bowl would mark the third game (out of four) of the playoffs in which Carolina scored 29 points.

Meanwhile, the Patriots first defeated the Tennessee Titans, 17–14, in one of the coldest games in NFL history, with temperatures reaching 4 °F (−15 °C). New England jumped to 14–7 lead in the first half with a touchdown pass by Brady and a touchdown run from Smith. However, Tennessee quarterback (and Co-NFL MVP; shared with  Indianapolis quarterback Peyton Manning) Steve McNair's 11-yard touchdown pass to receiver Derrick Mason tied the game in the third period. With 4:06 remaining in the game, Patriots kicker Adam Vinatieri made a 46-yard field goal to take the lead. New England's defense later clinched a victory as they stopped the Titans from scoring on fourth down on their last drive of the game.

New England then eliminated the Indianapolis Colts, 24–14, in the AFC Championship Game. The Colts entered the game leading the NFL in passing yards and ranked third in total offensive yards. With quarterback Peyton Manning, wide receiver Marvin Harrison, and running back Edgerrin James, the Colts had scored 79 points in their 2 playoff victories against the Denver Broncos and the Kansas City Chiefs, including a 38–31 victory over the Chiefs in the first punt-less game in NFL playoff history. However, New England's defense dominated the Colts, only allowing 14 points, intercepting 4 passes from Co-league MVP Manning (3 of them by Ty Law), and forcing a safety. Although New England's offense only scored one touchdown, Vinatieri scored 5 field goals to make up the difference.

Broadcasting
The game was broadcast on television in the United States by CBS, with Greg Gumbel handling the play-by-play duties and color commentator Phil Simms in the broadcast booth. Armen Keteyian and Bonnie Bernstein roamed the sidelines. Jim Nantz hosted all the events with help from his fellow cast members from The NFL Today: Dan Marino, Deion Sanders, and Boomer Esiason. This would be the final Super Bowl game Greg Gumbel would call; as before the 2004 season began, he and Nantz would switch roles; though by the time CBS next aired a Super Bowl; James Brown was brought in as host of The NFL Today while Gumbel had moved to a secondary play-by-play role. The game also aired in United Kingdom and Ireland on Channel 5 (British TV channel) and Sky Sports, Australia on public channel SBS, Japan on NHK BS1, China on CCTV-5, Austria on ORF 1 and Sweden on TV3.
In Mexico, the game was not carried as usual by neither of the major free-to-air national television networks. Making it a cable-exclusive event for the first and to date only time ever.

Westwood One carried the game nationwide over terrestrial radio with Marv Albert on play-by-play and Boomer Esiason on color commentary, with Jim Gray hosting the pregame and halftime shows. Locally, Gil Santos and Gino Cappelletti called the game for the Patriots and Bill Rosinski and Eugene Robinson served that position for the Panthers.

After the postgame coverage was complete, CBS aired the season premiere for Survivor: All-Stars.

Entertainment

Pregame ceremonies
Both teams passed on the opportunity for their starters to be introduced individually before the game, a move perpetuated by the Patriots in Super Bowl XXXVI.

The game was held exactly one year, to the day, after the Space Shuttle Columbia disaster, in Houston, the same city as the Johnson Space Center. Thus, the lost crew of the Columbia was honored in a pregame tribute by singer Josh Groban, performing "You Raise Me Up". Also appearing on the field was the crew of STS-114, the "Return to Flight" Space Shuttle mission that eventually launched Space Shuttle Discovery on July 26, 2005. Houston-native Beyoncé then sang the national anthem. Aerosmith performed Baby, Please Don't Go and Dream On as part of the pre-show ceremony.

The coin toss ceremony featured former NFL players and Texas natives Earl Campbell, Ollie Matson, Don Maynard, Y. A. Tittle, Mike Singletary, Gene Upshaw. Tittle tossed the coin.

The NFL logo was painted at midfield for the first time since Super Bowl XXX, and the Super Bowl XXXVIII logo was placed on the 25-yard lines. From Super Bowls XXXI through XXXVII, the Super Bowl logo was painted at midfield, and the helmets of the teams painted at the 30-yard lines. From Super Bowl VI through Super Bowl XXX, the NFL logo was painted on the 50-yard line, except for Super Bowls XXV and XXIX. The Super Bowl XXV logo was painted at midfield and the NFL logo was painted at each 35-yard line. In Super Bowl XXIX, the NFL 75th Anniversary logo was painted at midfield with the Super Bowl logo at each 30-yard line.

As the designated home team in the annual rotation between AFC and NFC teams, the Patriots elected to wear their home navy uniforms with silver pants, while the Panthers wore their road white uniforms with white pants.

Halftime show

The most controversial and widely discussed moment of Super Bowl XXXVIII came during halftime. The show was produced by Viacom's MTV and CBS Sports, and was sponsored by America Online's TopSpeed software for dial-up Internet service. The show was themed supposedly around MTV's Choose or Lose vote campaign; however, beyond some flag imagery, Jessica Simpson's declaration that Houston should "Choose to Party!" and a vague call to action for younger persons to vote (in a celebrity montage the first minute of the program and an audio outro about choices), the theme was not called out for the remainder of the show.

After a brief appearance by Simpson, the show began with a joint performance by marching bands the Spirit of Houston, from the University of Houston, and the "Ocean of Soul" of Texas Southern University. Next, Janet Jackson made her first appearance, singing "All for You". Then, P. Diddy, Nelly, and Kid Rock appeared respectively, and performed a mixture of their hits.

After Jackson's performance of her song "Rhythm Nation", Justin Timberlake appeared, and he and Jackson sang a duet of Timberlake's song "Rock Your Body". The performance featured many suggestive dance moves by both Timberlake and Jackson. As the song reached the final line, "I'm gonna have you naked by the end of this song," Timberlake pulled off a part of Jackson's costume, revealing her outer right breast (adorned with a large, sun-shaped nipple shield, a piece of jewelry worn to accentuate the appearance of a nipple piercing). CBS quickly cut to an aerial view of the stadium; however, the action was too late to be effective. Many people considered this indecent exposure, and numerous viewers contacted the network to complain, saying it was inappropriate in the context of a football game. This was the most rewatched moment in TiVo history.

Just before the start of the second half, a British streaker, Mark Roberts, ran onto the field disguised as a referee, undressed, and performed a dance wearing only a thong. He was tackled to the ground by Patriots linebacker Matt Chatham and arrested. It is customary for American television to avoid broadcasting such events, but it was later shown on Late Show with David Letterman. Roberts received a $1,000 fine for trespassing.

Game summary
This game is noted for its unusual scoring pattern between the teams. Nearly 90 percent of the first half and all of the third quarter were scoreless.  Twenty-four points were scored in the last three minutes of the first half, and a record 37 points were scored in the fourth quarter.

First quarter
Most of the first half was a defensive struggle, with neither team able to score until late in the second quarter, despite several early scoring opportunities for New England. After Carolina was forced to punt on their opening drive, Patriots receiver Troy Brown gave his team great field position with a 28-yard return to the Panthers 47-yard line. The Patriots subsequently marched to the 9-yard line, but Carolina kept them out of the end zone and Adam Vinatieri missed a 31-yard field goal attempt. The Patriots forced Carolina to punt after 3 plays and again got the ball with great field position, receiving Todd Sauerbrun's 40-yard punt at the Panthers 49-yard line. New England then drove to the 31-yard line, but on third down, linebacker Will Witherspoon tackled Brown for a 10-yard loss on an end-around play, pushing the Patriots out of field goal range.

Second quarter
Later on, New England drove 57 yards to the Panthers 18-yard line with 6 minutes left in the second quarter, but once again they failed to score as Carolina kept them out of the end zone and Vinatieri's 36-yard field goal attempt was blocked by Panthers defender Shane Burton.

Meanwhile, the Carolina offense was stymied by the New England defense, with quarterback Jake Delhomme completing just one out of his first nine passes, sacked three times, and fumbling once. That fumble occurred 3 plays after Vinatieri's second missed field goal; Delhomme lost the ball while being sacked by linebacker Mike Vrabel, and Patriots defensive tackle Richard Seymour recovered the ball at the Panthers 20-yard line; by this point of the game the Panthers had suffered a net loss of nine yards on twenty offensive snaps.

Two plays later, New England faced a third down and 7, but quarterback Tom Brady scrambled 12 yards to the 5-yard line for a first down. Then wide receiver Deion Branch caught a 5-yard touchdown pass from Brady on the next play. The play was a play-action fake to Antowain Smith. Carolina's Dan Morgan bit on the route, causing the touchdown.

Branch's touchdown came after 26:55 had elapsed in the game, setting the record for the longest amount of time a Super Bowl remained scoreless. The play also suddenly set off a scoring explosion from both teams for the remainder of the first half.

The Panthers stormed down the field on their ensuing possession, driving 95 yards in 8 plays, and tying the game on a 39-yard touchdown pass from Delhomme to wide receiver Steve Smith with just 1:07 left in the half.

The Patriots immediately countered with a 6-play, 78-yard scoring drive of their own. Starting from their own 22-yard line, Brady completed a 12-yard pass to wide receiver David Givens.  Then after throwing an incompletion, Brady completed a long pass to Branch, who caught it at the Panthers 24-yard line in stride before being tackled at the 14-yard line for a 52-yard gain.  Three plays later, Givens caught a 5-yard touchdown from Brady to give New England a 14–7 lead with only 18 seconds left in the half. The Patriots decided to squib kick the ensuing kickoff to prevent a long return, but their plan backfired as Carolina tight end Kris Mangum picked up the ball at his own 35-yard line and returned it 12 yards to the 47. The Patriots expected a pass play from the Panthers, but instead running back Stephen Davis ran for 21 yards on the next play to set up kicker John Kasay's 50-yard field goal as time expired in the half, cutting Carolina's deficit to 14–10.

Third quarter
The third quarter was scoreless as each team exchanged punts twice. However, with 3:57 left in the period, the Patriots put together a 71-yard, 8-play scoring drive, featuring tight end Daniel Graham's 33-yard reception to advance to the Carolina 9-yard line.

Fourth quarter
Running back Antowain Smith then capped off the drive with a 2-yard touchdown run on the second play on the fourth quarter to increase their lead, 21–10. This was the start of another scoring explosion, one that became one of the biggest explosions in Super Bowl history, with both teams scoring a combined 37 points in the last 15 minutes, the most ever in a single quarter of a Super Bowl.

Delhomme started out Carolina's ensuing drive with a 13-yard completion to wide receiver Muhsin Muhammad.  After committing a false start penalty on the next play, Delhomme completed a pair of passes to Smith for gains of 18 and 22 yards. Running back DeShaun Foster then scored on a 33-yard touchdown run, cutting the Panthers' deficit to 21–16 after Delhomme's 2-point conversion pass fell incomplete. The Patriots responded on their ensuing possession by driving all the way to Carolina's 9-yard line, but the drive ended when Panthers defensive back Reggie Howard intercepted a third down pass from Brady in the end zone. Then on 3rd down from his own 15-yard line, Delhomme threw for the longest play from scrimmage in Super Bowl history, an 85-yard touchdown completion to Muhammad. Carolina's 2-point conversion attempt failed again, but they took their first lead of the game, 22–21, with 6:53 remaining. It was the first time in Super Bowl history a team down 10+ points during the 4th quarter had come back to take the lead. Three other times teams have come back to tie the game; the Tennessee Titans against the Rams in Super Bowl XXXIV, the Rams against the Patriots in Super Bowl XXXVI, and the Patriots against the Falcons in Super Bowl LI.

However, New England retook the lead on their next drive, advancing 68 yards with the aid of a pair of completions from Brady to Givens for gains of 18 and 25 yards. Once again the Patriots were faced with third down and goal, but this time they scored with Brady's 1-yard pass to Vrabel, who had lined up in an eligible tight end position. Then on a two-point conversion attempt, running back Kevin Faulk took a direct snap and ran into the end zone to make the score 29–22. Despite amassing over 1,000 combined yards, Faulk's two-point conversion constituted the only points he scored all season.

The Panthers countered on their next possession.  Foster started the drive with a 9-yard run and a 7-yard reception.  After that, Delhomme completed a 19-yard pass to Muhammad, followed by a 31-yard completion to receiver Ricky Proehl.  Then Proehl, who caught the fourth quarter game-tying touchdown pass against the Patriots in Super Bowl XXXVI two years earlier for the St. Louis Rams, finished the drive with a 12-yard touchdown reception. Kasay's ensuing extra point tied the game, 29–29, with 1:08 to play in regulation and it appeared that the game would be the first Super Bowl ever to go into overtime.

However, Kasay kicked the ensuing kickoff out of bounds, giving New England the ball on their own 40-yard line. Brady led the Patriots offense down the field with a 13-yard pass to Brown on second down. An offensive pass interference penalty on Brown pushed New England back to their own 43-yard line, but another 13-yard reception to Brown and a 4-yard pass to Graham brought up a critical 3rd down and 3 from the Carolina 40-yard line. The Panthers defense could not prevent the Patriots from gaining the first down, as Brady completed a 17-yard pass to Branch. On the next play, Vinatieri kicked a 41-yard field goal to give New England the lead, 32–29, with four seconds left in the game. Carolina failed on their last chance, as Rod Smart went nowhere on the ensuing kickoff, and the Patriots had won their second Super Bowl in three years. This was the fourth Super Bowl to be decided on a field goal in the final seconds (Super Bowl V was won on a last second kick by the Baltimore Colts' Jim O'Brien to defeat the Dallas Cowboys, Super Bowl XXV had the Buffalo Bills' Scott Norwood miss his field goal chance against the New York Giants, and in Super Bowl XXXVI Vinatieri made his to defeat the St. Louis Rams, and later in Super Bowl LVII had Chiefs kicker, Harrison Butker to defeat the Philadelphia Eagles).

Box score

Statistical overview
The game set a number of marks for offensive production. The two teams combined for 868 yards of total offense, the second-highest total in Super Bowl history. Both starting quarterbacks threw for at least 300 yards for only the second time in Super Bowl history, with Dan Marino and Joe Montana each passing for at least 300 yards in Super Bowl XIX. This was also only the second Super Bowl to feature one 100-yard receiving performance on each team, with Deion Branch and Muhsin Muhammad each reaching 100 yards. Andre Reed and Michael Irvin first accomplished the feat in Super Bowl XXVII.

The 37 total points scored in the 4th quarter were the most combined points in a 4th quarter in a Super Bowl and the most in any quarter by two teams. Washington's 35 points in Super Bowl XXII was the previous high for most combined points in a single quarter in a Super Bowl. The fourth quarter was the second in Super Bowl history to have five touchdowns scored in a single quarter, the first being when the Redskins had five in Super Bowl XXII in the second quarter. It was also the first time in Super Bowl history that both teams would score at least two touchdowns in the same quarter.

Delhomme finished the game with 16 completions out of 33 attempts for 323 yards, three touchdowns, and no interceptions for a passer rating of 113.6. He was seen standing on the field during the Patriots' post-game celebration; he later commented: "I wanted to catch up to the moment of what it feels like to be on the other side, to be on this side, the losing side. To let it sink in, to hurt, so when we start practice in the fall, the two-a-days and there are days during the season when I'm tired and I want to go home, but I need to watch that extra film. I want to get back there, but I want to get on the other side of that field. They rope you off, the losing team basically. I just want to get on the other side of that rope. I just wanted to watch and let it sink in and hurt a little bit. When I have a tough day, I'll just think about that feeling and it will make me dig down just a little deeper."

Muhsin Muhammad caught four passes for 140 yards, an average of 35 yards per catch, and a touchdown. Steve Smith caught four passes for 80 yards and a touchdown. He also returned a punt for two yards, and returned a kickoff for 30 yards, giving him 112 total yards. Proehl caught four passes for 71 yards and a touchdown. Proehl joined Jerry Rice as one of only two players to score touchdowns with two teams in Super Bowls.

Tom Brady's 32 completions were the most in Super Bowl history. His 48 attempts were the most for a winning quarterback. His 354 yards passing is now the fifth best total in Super Bowl history.  Brady's passer rating for this game was 100.5. Branch was the top receiver of the game with 10 receptions for 143 yards and a touchdown. Brown caught 8 passes for 76 yards, and returned four punts for 40 yards. Antowain Smith was the top rusher of the game with 83 yards and a touchdown.

Final statistics
Sources:  NFL.com Super Bowl XXXVIII, Super Bowl XXXVIII Play Finder NE, Super Bowl XXXVIII Play Finder Car, USA Today Super Bowl XXXVIII Play by Play

Statistical comparison

Individual statistics

1Completions/attempts
2Carries
3Long gain
4Receptions
5Times targeted

Starting lineups
Source:

Gambling

 Most sportsbooks had the Patriots as seven-point favorites entering the game.  As the Patriots only won by three points, the Patriots failed to cover this spread.
 The over-under bet was set at 37.5 by most sportsbooks. As the total combined score of the two teams was 61 points, the over bet won.

Officials
 Referee: Ed Hochuli #85 second Super Bowl (XXXII)
 Umpire: Jeff Rice #44 second Super Bowl (XXXVI)
 Head Linesman: Mark Hittner #28 second Super Bowl (XXXVI)
 Line Judge: Ben Montgomery #117 second Super Bowl (XXXII)
 Field Judge: Tom Sifferman #118 second Super Bowl (XXXVII)
 Side Judge: Laird Hayes #125 second Super Bowl (XXXV)
 Back Judge: Scott Green #19 second Super Bowl (XXXVI)
 Alternate Referee: Bill Carollo #63 (side judge for XXXI, referee for XXXVII)
 Alternate Umpire: Jim Quirk #5 (umpire for XXXII)
 Alternate Field Judge: Bill Lovett #98 (field judge for XXXIII)

Tom Sifferman became the second official to work consecutive Super Bowls on the field. The first was Jim Tunney, the referee for Super Bowls XI and XII.

References

External links
 Super Bowl official website
 Game box score and play-by-play list from Pro Football Reference
 Super Bowl XXXVIII play-by-play from USA Today
 
 All-Time Super Bowl Odds from The Sports Network (Last accessed October 16, 2005)
 BBC News on Jackson's exposure
 Boxscore from Sports Illustrated
 Large online database of NFL data and statistics
 Super Bowl coverage from the Boston Globe
 Super Bowl coverage from Sports Illustrated 
 The Sporting News: History of the Super Bowl (Last accessed August 31, 2006)

2003 National Football League season
2004 in sports in Texas
2004 in American football
2004 in Houston
American football in Houston
Carolina Panthers postseason
New England Patriots postseason
Sports competitions in Houston
Super Bowl 038
February 2004 sports events in the United States
National Football League controversies
Tom Brady